Savignia frontata is a species of sheet weaver found in the Palearctic. It was described by Blackwall in 1833.

References

Linyphiidae
Spiders described in 1833
Spiders of Europe
Palearctic spiders